Matta is a village and Union Council of Kasur District in the Punjab province of Pakistan. It is part of Kasur Tehsil and is located at 31°10'28N 74°14'7E with an altitude of 199 metres (656 feet).

References

Kasur District